The 1984 Italian Grand Prix was a Formula One motor race held at Monza on 9 September 1984. It was the fourteenth race of the 1984 Formula One World Championship.

The 51-lap race was won by Austrian Niki Lauda, driving a McLaren-TAG, with local drivers Michele Alboreto and Riccardo Patrese second and third in a Ferrari and an Alfa Romeo respectively. With teammate Alain Prost retiring, Lauda opened up a 10.5-point lead over the Frenchman in the Drivers' Championship with two races remaining.

Pre-race
In the fortnight between the Dutch and Italian Grands Prix, the FIA Court of Appeal upheld the exclusion of the Tyrrell team from the championship for alleged technical infringements, and the team were duly banned from the final three races of the season. The Italian Grand Prix would thus be the first all-turbo Formula One race in history.

Meanwhile, the Toleman team had suspended Ayrton Senna for not informing them of his signing for Lotus for  before the deal was announced at Zandvoort. Stefan Johansson, out of a drive as a result of Tyrrell's ban, was drafted in to replace the Brazilian at Monza; he would be joined by newcomer Pierluigi Martini.

Qualifying

Qualifying report
Nelson Piquet took his seventh pole position of the season in his Brabham, with Alain Prost alongside him on the front row in his McLaren. The second row was made up of Elio de Angelis in the Lotus and Niki Lauda in the second McLaren, while the third row consisted of Teo Fabi in the second Brabham and Keke Rosberg in the Williams. The second Lotus of Nigel Mansell, the Renault of Patrick Tambay and the two Alfa Romeos of Riccardo Patrese and Eddie Cheever completed the top ten. Johansson was 17th in the Toleman while Martini, unfamiliar with the car, came 27th and last and thus failed to qualify.

Qualifying classification

Race

Race report
Manfred Winkelhock, who had qualified 21st in his ATS, suffered a gearbox failure on the formation lap for the second time in three races. Frustrated, he subsequently quit the team.

At the start, de Angelis passed Prost and Piquet, though the Brabham driver retook the lead into the first chicane. Tambay also made a fast start to run fourth, while Lauda fell to seventh behind Mansell and Fabi. While Piquet set about building a lead, Prost and Tambay overtook de Angelis, only for Prost's engine to fail on the fourth lap. In the meantime, Fabi and Lauda passed both Lotuses, and were thus up to third and fourth.

On lap 8, Fabi spun at the Roggia chicane, dropping to eighth; a charge put him back up to fourth by lap 12. By this point, Michele Alboreto in the Ferrari had also passed both Lotuses and was now fifth. While this was going on, a high attrition rate was building: the second Ferrari of René Arnoux suffered a gearbox failure on lap 6, while the two Ligiers of Andrea de Cesaris and François Hesnault dropped out on lap 8, followed shortly afterwards by the two Williams of Rosberg and Jacques Laffite. By lap 15 the two Lotuses had also retired, Mansell spinning off and de Angelis' gearbox failing.

Piquet continued to lead from Tambay, both clear of Lauda. On lap 16, Piquet's engine failed; at around the same time Fabi, continuing his charge, overtook Lauda to run second. Fabi then started to catch up to Tambay and by half-distance was on the Renault's tail, with Lauda keeping close behind; all three were clear of Alboreto, with Derek Warwick in the second Renault up to fifth and Cheever sixth. On lap 32, Warwick suffered an oil pressure problem, moving Johansson into the top six.

On lap 40, Lauda overtook Fabi at the Parabolica, before passing Tambay for the lead at the Roggia three laps later. Then, on lap 44, Fabi and Tambay suffered engine and throttle failures respectively. This left Lauda with a lead of 20 seconds over Alboreto, with Cheever up to third followed by Johansson, Patrese and the Osella of Piercarlo Ghinzani. On lap 46 Cheever ran out of fuel, followed three laps later by Ghinzani; meanwhile, Patrese passed Johansson for third. At the chequered flag, only Lauda and Alboreto were on the lead lap, with Patrese one lap behind Lauda and Johansson a further lap back. Completing the top six were Jo Gartner in the second Osella and Gerhard Berger in the second ATS, though neither driver would receive points as both their teams had officially entered only one car for the championship.

The win, Lauda's fifth of the season, put him 10.5 points clear of Prost at the top of the Drivers' Championship with two races remaining. In the Constructors' Championship, Alboreto's result enabled Ferrari to move ahead of Lotus into second behind McLaren.

Race classification

* Neither Gartner nor Berger were eligible for points, as they were driving the respective "second entries" of Osella and ATS and both teams had officially entered only one car for the entire championship.

Championship standings after the race

Drivers' Championship standings

Constructors' Championship standings

References

Italian Grand Prix
Grand Prix
Italian Grand Prix
Italian Grand Prix